Haley Peters (born September 17, 1992) is an American professional women's basketball forward. She was undrafted in the 2014 WNBA Draft, but has signed with three separate teams in her career.

College career
Before coming to Duke, Peters was a McDonald's All-America selection in 2010, and New Jersey Gatorade Player of the Year.  During her Freshman year at Duke, she started 9 games and was named to the All-ACC Academic Team, a feat she would accomplish during all 4 years at Duke.  Peters started all 33 of Duke's games during her Sophomore year, and 36 games during her Junior year.  As a Senior, she was a preseason Naismith National Player of the Year candidate and started 31 games for Duke.  While at Duke, Peters helped the Blue Devils win two ACC Women's Basketball Tournaments, three ACC regular season titles, and make three appearances in the Elite Eight of the NCAA Division I women's basketball tournament.  Peter's ranks sixth on Duke's all-time rebounding charts.

Duke statistics

Source

WNBA career
Peters was undrafted in the 2014 WNBA Draft.  Peters went unsigned until 2016, when she signed with the San Antonio Silver Stars.  Peters was waived in 2017 after making 34 appearances for the team. At the end of the 2017 season, the Washington Mystics signed Peters to a seven-day contract.  Peters would not play in the WNBA in 2018, but was signed by the Atlanta Dream prior to the 2019 season.

References

External links
Duke bio
WNBA bio

1992 births
Living people
American women's basketball players
Basketball players from New Jersey
Atlanta Dream players
Duke Blue Devils women's basketball players
Peddie School alumni
People from Red Bank, New Jersey
Sportspeople from Monmouth County, New Jersey
Forwards (basketball)